Arvinder is both a given name and a surname.

Notable people with the given name include:
Arvinder Singh Bubber, Canadian academic administrator
Arvinder Singh Lovely (born 1968), India politician
Arvinder Singh Soin (born 1963), Indian surgeon
Arvinder Singh (born 1996), sad boy artist

Notable people with the surname include:
Erik Arvinder (born 1984), Swedish violinist, multi-instrumentalist, arranger and orchestrator

Given names